Ideal is the only studio album by R&B group Ideal, released on August 24, 1999 by Virgin Records US.

The album sold 615,000 units in the U.S., according to Nielsen SoundScan, and was certified Gold by the RIAA. It features the hit single "Get Gone", which reached #13 on the Billboard Hot 100 chart, and the moderately successful third single "Whatever". Allmusic's Heather Phares called Ideal's initial effort a "heartfelt first album" which showcased the "group's smooth, sensuous vocal styling and romantic songwriting.

Track listing
Standard
 Credits adapted from standard liner notes.
 "Intro" (M. Cotton, C. Cotton, L. Perry, P. Alexander) (1:30)
 "I Don't Mind" (P. Stewart, C. Thomas, T. Nkhereanye, M. Scandrick, M. Keith, D. Jones, Q. Parker) (4:05)
 "Things You Can't Do" (J. Austin, T. Bishop, K. Hicks, C. Wallace, C. Smith, O. Harvey, Jr.) (3:49)
 "Creep Inn" (J. Austin, B. Casey, B. Casey, B. Cox, M. Jackson) (4:28)
 "Get Down With Me" (J. Robinson, E. Jackson, M. Cotton, J. Elias) (4:16)
 "Get Gone" (J. Austin, K. Hicks, B. Cox) (4:35)
 "Ideally Yours" (M. Cotton, C. Cotton, J. Green, L. Perry) (1:37)
 "All About You" (M. Cotton, J. Green, L. Perry, D. Scantlebury, M. Cooper, A. Crosley, L. McCall) (4:06)
 "Break Your Plans" (J. Robinson, J. Elias, J. Love) (4:15)
 "There's No Way" (J. Austin, T. Bishop, K. Hicks) (3:15)
 "Jealous Skies" (J. Thomas, J. Skinner, J. Thompson) (4:39)
 "Never Let You Go" (M. Cotton) (4:35)
 "Tell Me Why" (J. Walker, M. Cotton, C. Cotton, J. Green, L. Perry) (5:15)
 "No More" (J. Green, L. Perry) (1:11)
 "Pigeon" (Skit) (0:32)
 "Sexy Dancer" (P. Alexander, S. Watson, J. Smith) (3:48)
 "Outro" (M. Cotton, C. Cotton, J. Green, L. Perry, P. Alexander) (1:11)

Re-release
 Credits adapted from re-issue liner notes.
 "Intro" (M. Cotton, C. Cotton, L. Perry, P. Alexander)
 "I Don't Mind" (P. Stewart, C. Thomas, T. Nkhereanye, M. Scandrick, M. Keith, D. Jones, Q. Parker)
 "Things You Can't Do"(J. Austin, T. Bishop, K. Hicks, C. Wallace, C. Smith, O. Harvey, Jr.) 
 "Whatever [Radio Version]" (K. Gist, R.L. Huggar, E. Berkeley)
 "Creep Inn" (J. Austin, B. Casey, B. Casey, B. Cox, M. Jackson) 
 "Get Down With Me" (J. Robinson, E. Jackson, M. Cotton, J. Elias)
 "Get Gone" (J. Austin, K. Hicks, B. Cox)
 "Ideally Yours" (M. Cotton, C. Cotton, J. Green, L. Perry)
 "All About You" (M. Cotton, J. Green, L. Perry, D. Scantlebury, M. Cooper, A. Crosley, L. McCall)
 "Break Your Plans" (J. Robinson, J. Elias, J. Love)
 "There's No Way" (J. Austin, T. Bishop, K. Hicks)
 "Jealous Skies" (J. Thomas, J. Skinner, J. Thompson)
 "Never Let You Go" (M. Cotton)
 "Tell Me Why" (J. Walker, M. Cotton, C. Cotton, J. Green, L. Perry)
 "No More" (J. Green, L. Perry)
 "Pigeon" (Skit)
 "Sexy Dancer" (P. Alexander, S. Watson, J. Smith)
 "Get Gone [Remix Radio Version]" (J. Austin, K. Hicks, B. Cox)
 "Outro" (M. Cotton, C. Cotton, J. Green, L. Perry, P. Alexander)

Personnel
Credits adapted from liner notes.
 Keyboards and drum programming: Jazze Pha, Bryan-Michael Cox, Joe, Bishop "Stick" Burrell, PZ, Jon-John, J-Dub, Donnie Scantz, Teddy Bishop
 Guitar: Kevin Hicks
 Additional background vocals: Johnta Austin, Ericka "Babydoll" Jerry, Jazze Pha
 Recording engineer: Steve Durkee, Soloman Jackson, Kevin Hicks, Sinclair Ridley, Manny Marroquin, Adam Kudzin, Dave Aaron, Kevin "KD" Davis
 Mixing: Jazze Pha, Rick Camp, Manny Marroquin, Bishop "Stick" Burrell, Kevin "KD" Davis, Adam Kudzin
 Mastering: Eddy Schreyer
 Executive producer: Eric L. Brooks, Carmonique Roberts
 Photography: Reisig & Taylor, William Hanes
 Design: Jason Clark

Samples
Credits adapted from liner notes.
 "Things You Can't Do" contains a sample of "The What", as performed by The Notorious B.I.G. featuring Method Man
 "Creep Inn" contains a sample of "This Place Hotel", as performed by The Jacksons
 "All About You" contains a sample of "Promise You Love", as performed by Con Funk Shun
 "Sexy Dancer" contains a sample of "New Beginning", as performed by Dexter Wansel
 "Whatever" contains a sample of "Get Down Saturday Night", as performed by Oliver Cheatham.

Charts

Weekly charts

Year-end charts

References

1999 debut albums
Albums produced by Bryan-Michael Cox
Albums produced by Jazze Pha
Albums produced by Jermaine Dupri
Virgin Records albums
Albums produced by Laney Stewart